Miss America 2008, the 81st Miss America pageant, was held on the Las Vegas Strip in Paradise, Nevada, on Saturday, January 26, 2008.

The pageant was broadcast live on TLC from the Theatre for the Performing Arts at the Planet Hollywood Resort and Casino, only the third time that the pageant had been held outside Atlantic City.

Kirsten Haglund (Michigan) was crowned Miss America 2008 by Miss America 2007, Lauren Nelson.

Selection of contestants
One delegate from each state was chosen in state pageants held in mid-2007. Prior to competing in state pageants, the majority of delegates first were required to win a local title. Each delegate's title was pre-dated to 2007; for example, Jamie Langley was "Miss Alabama 2007" rather than "Miss Alabama 2008." Many contestants competed in state pageants in both the Miss America and Miss USA systems numerous times before they won titles. Some previously competed in states other than those where they won a state title.

All contestants had to be between 17 and 24 years old, unmarried, and a citizen of the United States. They had to meet residency and educational requirements.

Miss America: Reality Check
The pageant's new network, TLC, premiered a four-week reality competition, titled Miss America: Reality Check, on January 4, 2008, hosted by Ugly Betty actor Michael Urie. The premise of the show is to show the contestants preparing for the pageant and to update the image of the Miss America pageant, which had seen a decline in popularity over the last few decades. In addition, viewers were able to vote online and choose one of the delegates to be a finalist in the pageant.

Judges
The seven judges for the competition were fashion designer Trace Ayala, magazine editor Sarah Ivens, Olympic athlete and gold medalist Jackie Joyner-Kersee, casting director Jason La Padura, personal trainer Kim Lyons, television news anchor Robin Meade, and motivational speaker James Arthur Ray.

Competition
All delegates compete in an interview competition with the judges, based on their platform issue, and also in the swimsuit, evening gown and talent competitions.

Prior to the nationally televised competition, the delegates participate in three nights of preliminary competition, where preliminary award winners are chosen in each category.

For the first time, sixteen semi-finalists were chosen (fifteen based on the judges' vote and one extra "People's Choice" contestant based on internet voting). The top sixteen competed in the swimsuit competition, after which judges eliminated six contestants. This was the first time the eliminated contestants were called, rather than contestants called to progress to the next round. The top ten contestants competed in the evening gown competition, and then prepared for the talent competition. Eight contestants participated in Talent, and two were eliminated in the midst of the competition. The top eight then participated in a quickfire interview competition. In a return to past proceedings, the runners-up and winner were called out of the top eight.

Results

Placements

* - America's Choice

Order of announcements

Top 16

Top 10

Top 8

Awards

Preliminary awards

Quality of Life award

Other awards

Delegates

Notes

Crossovers
For the first time since Miss America 2003, four former Miss Universe Organization titleholders competed at Miss America.
They are:
 Kari Virding (Oregon) - Miss Oregon Teen USA 2000
 Ashley Bickford (Rhode Island) - Miss Connecticut Teen USA 2002, Top 10 at Miss Teen USA 2002; Triple Crown winner
 Grace Gore (Tennessee) - Miss Mississippi Teen USA 2002
 Cari Leyva (Alaska) - Miss Alaska USA 2004

References

External links
 Miss America official website

2008
2008 beauty pageants
2008 in the United States
2008 in Nevada
Zappos Theater
January 2008 events in the United States